Allie Light is an American film producer, film director and film editor. Light co-directed, edited and produced the 1991 documentary film, In the Shadow of the Stars, with her husband, Irving Saraf. Light and Saraf won the Academy Award for producing In the Shadow of the Stars.

Light married film producer Saraf, becoming his second wife. The couple formed a professional producing partnership beginning in 1971. In 1995, Light and Saraf were jointly nominated for a News and Documentary Emmy for their work on the PBS show, Dialogues with Madwomen.

Light's husband of thirty-eight years, Irving Saraf, died from Lou Gehrig’s disease at their home in San Francisco, California, on December 26, 2012, at the age of 80.

References

External links

 Allie Light at Women Make Movies

Film producers from California
American film editors
Living people
Businesspeople from San Francisco
Year of birth missing (living people)
Place of birth missing (living people)
Directors of Best Documentary Feature Academy Award winners
Film directors from San Francisco